Teofil Savniky (19 May 1894 – 23 January 1966) was a Hungarian middle-distance runner. He competed in the men's 1500 metres at the 1912 Summer Olympics. He was also a writer, and his work was part of the literature event in the art competition at the 1936 Summer Olympics.

References

1894 births
1966 deaths
Athletes (track and field) at the 1912 Summer Olympics
Hungarian male middle-distance runners
Olympic athletes of Hungary
20th-century Hungarian male writers
Olympic competitors in art competitions
Writers from Budapest
Athletes from Budapest